The 1956 Newfoundland general election was held on 2 October 1956 to elect members of the 31st General Assembly of Newfoundland. It was won by the Liberal party.

Results

*CCF votes are among the 1,964 ballots categorized as "other". This was the CCF's first election, Sam Drover had been a cabinet minister in the Liberal government until he quit and decided to found the CCF in the province. The party ran 10 candidates in the 1956 election, the first time it had contested a provincial election in Newfoundland.

References
 

Elections in Newfoundland and Labrador
Newfoundland
1956 in Newfoundland and Labrador
October 1956 events in Canada